HMS Radstock was the first in a class of 62  destroyers. The design differed from the preceding  primarily in the use of geared turbines, which gave better fuel efficiency. The ship was launched in 1916 and served with the Grand Fleet of the Royal Navy during World War I as in an escort and anti-submarine role. While escorting a convoy in 1918, the destroyer collided with the merchant ship Volute, but otherwise had an uneventful war. After the Armistice of 11 November 1918 that ended the war, the vessel was recommissioned with reduced complement and joined the Reserve Fleet. Radstock stayed in Reserve until 1927. By this time, the vessel had deteriorated and, despite having a refit in 1925, was deemed unfit for service and was sold to be broken up.

Design and development
Radstock was originally ordered by the British Admiralty in May 1915 as part of the Sixth War Construction Programme as one of eighteen  destroyers. However, the ship was equipped with two geared steam turbines and became the prototype for the R-class.

Three funnels were fitted.

Armament consisted of three QF  Mk IV guns on the ship's centreline, with one on the forecastle, one aft on a raised platform and one between the second and third funnels. A single QF 2-pounder  "pom-pom" anti-aircraft gun was carried, while torpedo armament consisted of two twin mounts for  torpedoes. The ship had a complement of 82 officers and ratings.

Construction and service
Radstock was laid down by Swan Hunter & Wigham Richardson at Wallsend on the River Tyne on 5 September 1915 with yard number 1005 and launched on 8 June 1916. The vessel was completed on 20 September that year.

On commissioning, Radstock joined the newly created Fifteenth Destroyer Flotilla of the Grand Fleet. The destroyer was soon in action, patrolling the North Sea for submarines. Despite participating in a number of sweeps, the vessel did not sight the enemy. Convoys often operated at night and in very difficult conditions, and accidents happened. The vessel was found jointly culpable for a collision with the merchant ship Volute, which was leading a convoy that Radstock and sistership  were escorting, on 12 April 1918. Radstock remained part of the Fifteenth Destroyer Flotilla at the end of the war.

After the Grand Fleet was disbanded, Radstock briefly joined the Fourth  Destroyer Flotilla, but on 16 September 1919, the ship was paid off to join Reserve Destroyer Flotilla at the Nore. Shortly afterwards, on 15 October, the ship was recommissioned with Reduced Complement and based at Port Edgar, although still part of the Reserve Fleet. In 1923, the Navy decided to scrap many of the older destroyers, up to and including some of the R-class, in preparation for the introduction of newer and larger vessels. However, it looked as if Radstock was to be retained and, on 2 June 1925, the destroyer, based again at the Nore, undertook an extensive refit in Sheerness. However, having spent so long stored in reserve, the destroyer had deteriorated and was considered by the Admiralty to be in too poor condition to return to operations. On 29 April 1927, Radstock was retired and sold to Thos. W. Ward to be broken up at Grays.

Pennant numbers

References

Notes

Bibliography

 
 
 
 
 
 
 
 
 
 

1916 ships
Ships built on the River Tyne
R-class destroyers (1916)
World War I destroyers of the United Kingdom